Tonyrefail Welfare AFC are a football club based in Tonyrefail, Wales, currently playing in the Rhondda & District League Championship, which is at the eighth tier of the Welsh Football Pyramid.  They played in the Welsh Football League between 1952 and 1999 and have in the past played in the top division of league football in South Wales.

History
The actual date Tonyrefail Welfare AFC was formed is not known with any degree of certainty, but it is probably safe to assume that with the opening of the Welfare park in 1925, a team was in existence at that time and took the name of Tonyrefail Welfare AFC. The early days were spent in the local leagues, where much success was achieved in the league and cup competitions. After World War Two the team joined the South Wales Amateur League and success continued by winning the league title in 1951 and the Corinthian Cup in 1950 and 1952 and also notably winning the Brecon Corinthian cup in three successive years 1949–1951.

Welsh Football League
The club joined the Welsh Football League in season 1952–53, winning the Division Two West title in their first season. The club continued as members for 46 seasons until they were relegated in 1998–99. Most of the club's successes came in the 1950s and 1960s, when they played in the Premier Division of the Welsh League and had a number of appearances in cup. Appearances were made in the South Wales FA Senior Cup in 1954, 1967 and 1969, and the Welsh Amateur Cup in 1969, finishing as runners-up in each final.

Back to local league football
The club struggled to stay in the lower divisions and faced near liquidation in 2004, but survived after local lottery winner and ex-player David Williams bought the club. In 2009 a stand collapsed at the Welfare Ground. Nobody was hurt in the incident but the ground has since closed. The club were relegated to the Rhondda & District League Premier League after a poor performance in the 2010–11 season – a far cry from the glory days of the 1980s. At the start of the 2017–18 season the club returned to its historic ground.

Honours 

Welsh Football League
Division One – Champions: 1966–67
Division Two West – Champions: 1952–53
South Wales Amateur League
Champions: (1) – 1951
Corinthian Cup
Winners: (2) – 1950, 1952
Brecon Corinthian Cup
Winners: (3) – 1949, 1950, 1951
South Wales FA Senior Cup
Runners-up: (3) – 1954, 1967, 1969
Welsh Amateur Cup
Runners-up: (1) – 1969

References

1925 establishments in Wales
Welsh Football League clubs
South Wales Amateur League clubs
Rhondda & District League
Rhondda & District League clubs